Ambrose Ramsey (died June 29, 1805) was native of Ireland, a member of the North Carolina senate eleven times, a large land holder and pioneer in Chatham County, North Carolina, Colonel and commander of the Chatham County Regiment of the North Carolina militia during the Revolutionary War from 1775-1783.  He served as acting commander of the Salisbury District Brigade in 1781.  He was captured by the British Loyalists at the Chatham Courthouse on July 17, 1781 and released on parole later in 1781.  After the war, he was selected as brigadier general in charge of the Hillsborough District Brigade.

Occupations
Ambrose Ramsey held the following positions:
 1775, presiding justice of the Inferior Court of Please and Quarter Sessions of Chatham County, Province of North Carolina; when independence from British rule in Chatham County was declared 
 April 4, 1776, delegate to the Fourth Provincial Congress at Halifax.  This Congress passed the Halifax Resolves.
 December 23, 1776, chosen as justice of Chatham County
 17771781, 17831788, elected as State Senator eleven times to the North Carolina General Assembly
 Member of the Hillsborough District Committee of Safety member
 September 18, 1780, North Carolina War Board sent him an order to raise troops for the Chatham County militia
 July 16, 1781, captured by British Colonel David Fanning at Chatham Courthouse
 1786, trustee of Pittsboro Academy
 July 25, 1788, delegate to North Carolina's Hillsborough Convention on the United States Constitution

Family
Ambrose had two brothers, John and Matthew Ramsey.  John was a justice of Chatham County and also served as clerk of court.  Matthew was a Captain of a Company of Light Horse during the Revolutionary War and also captured at Chatham Courthouse.  He ran a mill on Rocky Creek, called Green's mill.

Ambrose ran a mill, Ramsey's Mill, that was located on the present site of the Lockville Dam, Canal and Powerhouse in Chatham County, North Carolina.

Ambrose died on June 29, 1805 in Chatham County.

References

Additional Sources
 1790 and 1800 Census, Chatham County, North Carolina
 1779 Chatham County, North Carolina land records, granted 640 acres

1805 deaths
North Carolina militiamen in the American Revolution
People from Chatham County, North Carolina
North Carolina state senators
Militia generals in the American Revolution
Members of the North Carolina Provincial Congresses